McFadden House may refer to:

United States
(by state)
Phillip G. McFadden House, Tucson, Arizona, listed on the NRHP in Pima County, Arizona
McFadden House (Holton, Kansas), listed on the NRHP in Jackson County, Kansas
Beecher-McFadden Estate, Peekskill, New York, listed on the NRHP in Westchester County, New York
John H. McFadden House, Bartlett, Tennessee, listed on the NRHP in Shelby County, Tennessee
O. B. McFadden House, Chehalis, Washington, listed on the NRHP in Lewis County, Washington